The Avro 571 Buffalo was a prototype British carrier-based torpedo bomber biplane, designed and built by Avro in the 1920s. It was not selected for service, the Blackburn Ripon being ordered instead.

Design and development
The Avro 571 Buffalo was designed by Avro as a private venture to meet the requirements of Air Ministry Specification 21/23, for a two-seat torpedo bomber and reconnaissance aircraft, intended to replace the Blackburn Dart. The prototype (G-EBNW) first flew at the Avro works at Hamble during 1926. It was evaluated against the Blackburn Ripon and the Handley Page Harrow, but was found to have poor handling and was therefore rejected.

The prototype was therefore rebuilt as the Avro 572 Buffalo II, with new, all-metal wings, fitted with controllable Handley Page slats and a more powerful engine. In this form, the Buffalo was much improved. By this time however, the Ripon had been declared the competition winner.

Operational history
After it failed to be ordered into production, the Buffalo was converted into a seaplane in 1928 for the Air Ministry. As serial number N239, it was used for trials at the Marine Aircraft Experimental Establishment at Felixstowe.

Variants
Avro 571 Buffalo I
Prototype powered by 450 hp (340 kW) Napier Lion Va engine.
Avro 572 Buffalo II
Rebuilt Buffalo I with new wing and powered by 530 hp (400 kW) Lion XIA.

Operators

Air Ministry

Specifications (Buffalo II)

See also

References

Notes

Bibliography

 Jackson, A.J. Avro Aircraft since 1908. London: Putnam Aeronautical Books 2nd edition, 1990. .
 Mason, Francis K. The British Bomber since 1914. London: Putnam Aeronautical Books, 1994. .

1920s British bomber aircraft
Buffalo
Biplanes
Single-engined tractor aircraft